Gary Gilbert (born 1965) is an American film producer and businessman. He is the founder and CEO of Gilbert Films, a media production and financing company based in Los Angeles, California. He is also a co-founder of Rocket Mortgage, as well as a co-owner of the Cleveland Cavaliers, NBA team.

Biography
Gilbert was born in 1965 to a Jewish family and received a business administration degree (BBA) from the University of Michigan's Ross School of Business.

Gilbert was one of the producers of La La Land (2016), which matched the record of 14 Academy Award nominations. Gilbert began his career when he financed and produced the 2004 feature film Garden State starring Zach Braff and Natalie Portman. In 2005, Gilbert, along with Braff, won an Independent Spirit Award for Best First Feature Film. In  2010, Gilbert produced The Kids Are All Right, which after premiering at the Sundance Film Festival was acquired by Focus Features (Universal Studios). The film won two Golden Globes in 2011.  Gilbert also produced Are You Here, starring Owen Wilson, Zach Galifianakis and Amy Poehler.

Gilbert is also a co-owner of the National Basketball Association team the Cleveland Cavaliers, along with Usher and his brother, Dan Gilbert, chairman of Quicken Loans. Gilbert founded Rock Financial in 1985 with his older brother Dan, Ron Berman and Lindsay Gross.  After a series of mergers, the company, through Quicken Loans, has become one of the nation's largest mortgage lenders.

Partial filmography as producer
 2020: If Anything Happens I Love You
 2016: La La Land 
 2011: Margaret
 2011: From Prada to Nada
 2010: The Kids Are All Right 
 2004: Garden State

References

External links

1965 births
Living people
Cleveland Cavaliers owners
Film producers from Michigan
Golden Globe Award-winning producers
National Basketball Association owners
People from Oakland County, Michigan
Ross School of Business alumni
20th-century American Jews
21st-century American Jews